The following is a list of notable individuals who were born in and/or have lived in Lakewood, Colorado.

Academia

Irving Friedman (1920-2005), geochemist
Carl J. Johnson (1929-1988), epidemiologist, anti-nuclear activist
Sol Katz (1947-1999), software engineer
Charles Repenning (1922-2005), paleontologist
Douglas Darden (1951-1996), architectural designer and theorist 
Tim Samaras (1957-2013), engineer, storm chaser
Robert Zubrin (1952- ), aerospace engineer, author

Arts and entertainment

Film, television, and theatre
Hayden Byerly (2000- ), actor
Derek Cianfrance (1974- ), film director, screenwriter
Gregg Henry (1952- ), actor
Katie Leclerc (1986- ), actress

Music
Chris Broderick (1970- ), guitarist

Art & Architecture
Douglas Darden (1951-1996), architectural designer, artist, writer

Business
May Bonfils Stanton (1883-1962), Colorado heiress and philanthropist
William A. H. Loveland (1826-1894), railroad entrepreneur, city founder

Crime
Dylan Klebold (1981-1999), mass murderer

Military
Elmer E. Fryar (1914-1944), U.S. Army Private, Medal of Honor recipient

Politics

National
Robert E. Blackburn (1950- ), U.S. federal judge
Daniel B. Sparr (1931-2006), U.S. federal judge

State
Betty Boyd (1943- ), Colorado state legislator
Andy Kerr (1968- ), Colorado state legislator
Brittany Pettersen, Colorado state legislator
Daniel Schaefer, Congressman (1936-2006) who resided in Lakewood during his time in office.
Max Tyler (1947- ), Colorado state legislator

Local
Steve Burkholder, Mayor of Lakewood

Sports

American football
John McCormick (1937-2013), quarterback, punter
Joe Romig (1941- ), guard
Marc Schiechl (1987- ), linebacker
Jeremiah Sirles (1991- ), offensive tackle

Baseball
Bill Hubbell (1897-1980), pitcher
Marty Lang (1905-1968), pitcher
Tim Lollar (1956- ), pitcher

Ice hockey
Mat Clark (1990- ), defense

Soccer
Jordan Angeli (1986- ), defender, forward
Jeb Brovsky (1988- ), defender
Aleisha Cramer (1982- ), midfielder
Marian Dougherty (1984- ), defender
Isaiah Schafer (1990- ), defender

Other
Chris Camozzi (1986- ), mixed martial artist
Jeff Fosnes (1954- ), basketball small forward
Scott Gaylord (1958- ), race car driver
Mel Proctor (1951- ), sports announcer
Steve Williams (1960-2009), pro wrestler

References

Lakewood, Colorado
Lakewood
People from Lakewood, Colorado